"The Twist" is an American pop song written and originally released in 1958 by Hank Ballard and the Midnighters as a B-side to "Teardrops on Your Letter". It was inspired by the twist dance craze. Ballard's version was a moderate hit, peaking at number 28 on the Billboard Hot 100 in 1960. On the US Billboard Hot R&B Sides chart, the original version of "The Twist" first peaked at number sixteen in 1959 and at number six in 1960.

Chubby Checker's 1960 cover version of the song reached number 1 on the Billboard Hot 100 on September 19, 1960, where it stayed for one week, and setting a record at the time as the only song to reach number 1 in two different hit parade runs when it resurfaced and topped the popular hit parade again for two weeks starting on January 13, 1962. This would not happen for another song for nearly 59 years until December 2020, when Mariah Carey's "All I Want for Christmas Is You" reached the summit after previously topping in another separate chart run in December 2019.

In 1988, "The Twist" again became popular due to a new recording of the song by The Fat Boys featuring Chubby Checker. This version reached number 2 in the United Kingdom and number 1 in Germany. In 2014, Billboard magazine declared the song the "biggest hit" of the 1960s.

History
Hank Ballard wrote "The Twist" after seeing teenagers in Tampa, Florida doing the titular dance. In a 2014 interview with Tom Meros, Midnighters member Lawson Smith claimed that The Gospel Consolaters' Nathaniel Bills wrote the song and initially asked The Spaniels to record it, and that Ballard "stole" the song, falsely claiming authorship. Green and Ballard already had written a song together called "Is Your Love for Real", which was based on Clyde McPhatter and The Drifters' 1955 song "What'cha Gonna Do", so they created an entirely new song by simply putting the new Twist words to the older melody. They originally recorded a loose version of the song in a Florida studio for Vee-Jay Records in early 1958, with slightly different lyrics, featuring Green on guitar playing like Jimmy Reed. This version appeared on the box set "The Vee-Jay Story" in 1993, but it went unreleased at the time. They did not get around to recording the released version until November 11, 1958, when the Midnighters were in Cincinnati.

Ballard thought "The Twist" was the hit side, but King Records producer Henry Glover preferred the ballad "Teardrops on Your Letter", which he'd written himself. The song ultimately became the B-side of Hank Ballard and The Midnighters' 1959 single "Teardrops on Your Letter".

Chubby Checker version

The song became popular on a Baltimore television dance show hosted by local DJ Buddy Deane; Deane recommended the song to Dick Clark, host of the national American Bandstand. When the song proved popular with his audience, Clark attempted to book Ballard to perform on the show. Ballard was unavailable, and Clark searched for a local artist to record the song. He settled on Checker, whose voice was very similar to Ballard's. Checker's version featured Buddy Savitt on sax and Ellis Tollin on drums, with backing vocals by the Dreamlovers. Exposure for the song on American Bandstand and on  The Dick Clark Saturday Night Show helped propel the song to the top of the American charts.

In July 1960, Checker performed "The Twist" for the first time in front of a live audience at the Rainbow Club in Wildwood, New Jersey, and just weeks later, on Aug. 6, 1960, the song became a national sensation after Checker performed it on Dick Clark's American Bandstand.

In late 1961 and early 1962, the twist craze belatedly caught on in high society. Sightings of celebrities doing the dance made the song a hit with adults, particularly after a report in the Cholly Knickerbocker gossip column. Soon there were long lines at the Peppermint Lounge nightclub in New York, the most popular celebrity twisting spot. This new interest made "The Twist" the first recording to hit number one on the United States charts during two separate chart runs, and marked a major turning point for adult acceptance of rock and roll music.

Checker re-recorded the song numerous times. An updated 1982 recording (from his album The Change Has Come) was retitled "T-82", and in the 1990s, he recorded a country version. In the late 1970s, he recorded a new version that, except for the sound mix and some minor arrangement changes, was identical to the 1960 original; as a result this later version is often misidentified on compilations as the original recording. In 1988, he joined The Fat Boys on a rap version of the song, which hit number 2 in the UK, number 16 in the US, and number 1 in Germany and Switzerland. Checker also joined the group to perform the song that summer at a London tribute concert for Nelson Mandela. In addition, he recorded variations on the theme, such as "Let's Twist Again" to keep the craze alive ("Let's Twist Again" was and has remained more popular than "The Twist" itself in the United Kingdom). Joey Dee and the Starliters, the Peppermint Lounge house band, scored a hit with "Peppermint Twist", while other artists, including Sam Cooke scored with other "Twist"-themed songs. In Europe, Petula Clark scored hits in several countries with "Twist"-themed records, while Bill Haley and His Comets recorded several albums of Twist songs in Mexico for the Orfeon Records label. In 1997, the song was featured in a Teledyne Waterpik commercial, and a commercial for Denny's in 1998, to promote the New Slams.

In the sixth episode of the second season of the TV series Quantum Leap, entitled "Good Morning, Peoria" (set on September 9, 1959), Dr. Sam Beckett (Scott Bakula) and Al Calavicci (Dean Stockwell) have a Kiss with History, meeting Chubby Checker (played by himself) in a radio station (Sam leaps into a radio DJ called Chick Howell), where they sing and dance "The Twist". An impressed Checker asks, "Can I use that move?" Sam responds, "Yah, but I got it from you!"

Checker later toured with this signature piece throughout the U.S. Midwest in the 1980s. The song was used in 2007 in Spider-Man 3.

Weekly charts

Year-end charts

Decade-end charts

All-time charts

Accolades
Chubby Checker's "The Twist" held the honor of being the most successful single in Billboard history on its various "Greatest Hot 100 Songs of All Time" charts over the decades. It held the title until 2021, when it was dethroned by The Weeknd's "Blinding Lights".

The song is ranked number 451 on the Rolling Stone magazine's list of The 500 Greatest Songs of All Time in 2004 and number 457 in 2010. Jim Dawson wrote a 1995 book about the song and the Twist phenomenon called The Twist: The Story of the Song and Dance That Changed the World for Faber and Faber.

The song has been added to the National Recording Registry in the Library of Congress on March 21, 2013 for long-term preservation. In 2014, Billboard magazine declared the song the "biggest hit" of the 1960s.

In 2018, Checker's version was one of six singles inducted into the Rock and Roll Hall of Fame in a new category honoring singles by artists who have not been elected to the Hall.

Editions
USA: Hank Ballard and the Midnighters: "Teardrops on Your Letter" b/w "The Twist" 1959
USA: Chubby Checker: "The Twist" b/w "Toot" Parkway 811; 7/60
USA: Chubby Checker: "The Twist" b/w "Twistin' USA" Parkway 811; 11/61

See also
List of Billboard Hot 100 number-one songs of 1960
List of Billboard Hot 100 number-one songs of 1962
List of number-one hits of 1988 (Germany)
List of number-one hits of 1988 (Switzerland)
Twist songs

References

External links
Chubby Checker discography

1958 songs
1960 singles
1961 singles
Hank Ballard & the Midnighters songs
Chubby Checker songs
Billboard Hot 100 number-one singles
Cashbox number-one singles
Number-one singles in Germany
Number-one singles in Switzerland
Songs written by Hank Ballard
Twist (dance)
Songs about dancing
United States National Recording Registry recordings